ZDFneo is a German free-to-air television channel, programmed for an audience aged 25 to 49 to counter the primarily older-skewing main channels of public broadcasters ZDF and ARD. It replaced ZDF's documentary channel ZDFdokukanal on 1 November 2009.

History
On 1 October 2017, the station was to receive a new on-air design and a new broadcasting logo; this was brought forward to 26 September 2017.

Distribution
ZDFneo is broadcast (along with the rest of ZDFvision) via DVB-T digital terrestrial television, receivable in most areas of Germany. It is also transmitted in DVB-C through German cable networks, and in DVB-S from the Astra 1H satellite.

Since 30 April 2012, ZDFneo has been broadcast in HD (720p).  The program was initially only scaled up by 576i, since ZDFneo had no HD-capable playout at this time. Since mid-May 2015, the program is broadcast in native HD quality.

Programmes 
ZDFneo's broadcasts mostly consists of comedy and drama series produced in-house. Shows imported from America and the United Kingdom plus a few documentaries, music shows, and movies round out the schedule.

Repeats of ZDF programming
 Die Deutschen ("The Germans"; history)
 Alisa – Folge deinem Herzen ("Follow your heart"; soap opera)
 Bianca – Wege zum Glück ("The way to happiness"; soap opera)
 Der letzte Zeuge (2009–present)
 Lafer! Lichter! Lecker! ("Lafer, Lichter, delicious!"; talk, cooking)
 Terra X (history)
 Abenteuer Wissen ("Knowledge Adventure"; science, history)
Neues aus der Anstalt ("News from the (mental) institution"; cabaret)
 Helen Dorn (2014–present)
Heute Show (satire)
Lena: Liebe meines Lebens ("Lena: Love of my Life"; soap opera)
 Neo Magazin Royale (late-night satire talk show; continuation of NeoMagazin mit Jan Böhmermann which was aired on ZDFneo)

Original programming
 Schulz & Böhmermann (talk show)
 Iss oder quizz (game show)
 Süper Tiger Show (comedy)
 neoMusik (music)
 neoLeben (living)
 Neo Magazin (Talk show)
 Der Straßenchor ("The Street Choir"; music)
 Hochzeitsfieber! ("Wedding Fever!"; living)
 Comedy Lab (comedy)
 Bambule (culture/current affairs)

Imported series

 100 Code (2016-2017)
 30 Rock (2009-2015)
 Agatha Raisin (2017–present)
 Being Erica (Being Erica - Alles auf Anfang) (2011)
 Candice Renoir (2016–present)
 Dawson's Creek (2011-2012)
 Death in Paradise (2012–present)
 Dicte (2014–present)
 Dirty Sexy Money (2011-2012)
 Endeavour (Der junge Inspektor Morse) (2017–present)
 Fargo (2016–present)
 Father Brown (2014–present)
 Free Agents (comedy; titled Free Agents – Zweisam einsam, engl. Free Agents – Twosome lonesome) (2010-2011)
 From Darkness (2017)
 George Gently (George Gently - Der Unbestechliche) (2011)
 Gidseltagningen (Countdown Copenhagen/Below the Surface) (2017–present)
 Hart to Hart (drama; titled Hart aber herzlich)
 Hooten & the Lady (2017–present)
 How Not to Live Your Life (comedy) (2010-2011)
 Huff (drama)
 Hustle (drama; titled Hustle – Unehrlich währt am längsten, engl. Hustle – Dishonest it works much longer )
 In Plain Sight (drama)
 In Treatment (drama)
 Jack Taylor (2015-2016, 2018–present)
 Line of Duty (2015–present)
 Luther (psychological crime drama)
 Mad Men (drama)
 Magic City (2013-2015)
 Magnum, P.I. (Magnum) (2011-2015)
 Miami Vice (drama)
 Midsummer Murders (detective drama; titled Inspector Barnaby)
 Mr Selfridge (2014-2016)
 New Tricks (New Tricks - Die Krimispezialisten) (2017–present)
 No Offence (2016–present)
 Orange Is the New Black (2017–present)
 Outcast (2017–present)
 Ray Donovan (2016–present)
 Safe House (2016–present)
 Scott & Bailey (2012–present)
 Seinfeld (2009-2012)
 Spooks (drama; titled Spooks – Im Visier des MI5, engl. Spooks – In sight of the MI5)
 Star Trek (Sci Fi; titled Raumschiff Enterprise, engl. Spaceship Enterprise)
 Taking the Flak (dramedy; titled Taking the Flak – Reporter auf Kriegsfuß, engl. Taking the Flak – Reporters at war)
 The Aliens (2016, 2018)
 The Big C (The Big C ... und jetzt ich!) (2011-2014)
 The Fades (2012-2014)
 The Fall (The Fall – Tod in Belfast) (2016-2017)
 The Fear (2012) (2014–present)
 The Inspector Lynley Mysteries (mystery)
 The Missing (2017–present)
 Wayward Pines (2017–present)
 Weeds (Weeds - Kleine Deals unter Nachbarn) (2010-2012)

Logos

Audience share

Germany

References

External links
 

Publicly funded broadcasters
German-language television stations
Television stations in Germany
Television channels and stations established in 2009
Mass media in Mainz
ZDF